Rocco J. "Rocky" Carzo ( 1932 – January 16, 2022) was an American college football and lacrosse coach and athletics administrator. He served as the head football coach at Tufts University from 1966 to 1973, compiling a record of 22–41–1. A native of Woodlyn, Pennsylvania, Carzo played college football as a fullback at the University of Delaware from 1950 to 1953. He was also the head lacrosse coach at Delaware from 1958 to 1959, tallying a mark of 10–10. Carzo was the athletic director at Tufts from 1973 to 1999.

Carzo died on January 16, 2022, at the age of 89.

Head coaching record

Football

References

1930s births
2022 deaths
Year of birth missing
American football fullbacks
California Golden Bears football coaches
Delaware Fightin' Blue Hens football coaches
Delaware Fightin' Blue Hens football players
Delaware Fightin' Blue Hens men's lacrosse coaches
Tufts Jumbos football coaches
High school football coaches in Delaware
Sportspeople from Delaware County, Pennsylvania
Coaches of American football from Pennsylvania
Players of American football from Pennsylvania